Naufal Rahmanda (born May 16, 2000) is an Indonesian professional footballer who plays as a forward for Liga 2 club Semen Padang.

Club career

Persela Lamongan
He was signed for Persela Lamongan to play in Liga 1 in the 2021 season. Rahmanda made his first-team debut on 4 September 2021 in a match against PSIS Semarang at the Wibawa Mukti Stadium, Cikarang.

Semen Padang
Naufal was signed for Semen Padang to play in Liga 2 in the 2022–23 season. He made his league debut on 29 August 2022 in a match against PSPS Riau at the Riau Main Stadium, Riau.

Career statistics

Club

Notes

References

External links
 Naufal Rahmanda at Soccerway
 Naufal Rahmanda at Liga Indonesia

2000 births
Living people
Indonesian footballers
Persela Lamongan players
Association football forwards
Sportspeople from Bandung
21st-century Indonesian people